Kőtelek is a village in Jász-Nagykun-Szolnok county, in the Northern Great Plain region of central Hungary.

Geography
Kőtelek is located on the right bank of the Tisza, in the central-north-eastern part of the county, about 30 km northeast of Szolnok . The neighboring municipalities Nagykörű , Tiszasüly and Hunyadfalva or expelled from the left bank of Tiszabő.

References

External links
 Official site in Hungarian

Populated places in Jász-Nagykun-Szolnok County